Charter 97 is a declaration calling for democracy in Belarus and a pro-human rights news site taking its inspiration from the declaration. The document – the title of which deliberately echoes the Czechoslovak human rights declaration Charter 77 20 years earlier – was created on the anniversary of a referendum held in 1996, and which, in the words of the organization of the same name, declares:

"devotion to the principles of independence, freedom and democracy, respect to the human rights, solidarity with everybody, who stands for elimination of dictatorial regime and restoration of democracy in Belarus".

Belarusian journalist Pavał Šaramiet acted as the group's spokesman at the declaration's public launch.

Charter 97, as a citizens' human rights organisation based on the principles outlined in this document, is a non-partisan organisation which has organised protest rallies and has provided a springboard for other democratic movements in the country. It also maintains a website of news with a focus on human rights developments.  The site's editor-in-chief, Natalla Radzina, received the 2011 International Press Freedom Award, "an annual recognition of courageous journalism", for her work.

On 3 September 2010, the body of the founder of Charter 97, Aleh Biabienin, was found in his house near Minsk. According to initial statements by the Belarusian government, Biabienin committed suicide by hanging himself. However, friends of Biabienin have rejected this, stating that there was no indication he was planning to commit suicide, and that there were no messages or notes left behind.

In the weeks following the disputed December 2010 presidential election – in which pro-democracy candidate Andrej Sańnikaŭ lost to Lukashenko, often called "Europe's last dictator" – a number of opposition protesters took to the streets, alleging fraud. Radzina and the Charter 97 staff posted numerous articles documenting arrests and injuries to the protesters by state security forces. On 21 December 2010, the Charter 97 office was raided by agents of the State Security Committee of the Republic of Belarus (known in Russian as the "KGB"). Radina only had time to post "We're all at the KGB" on the site before being arrested and taken away.

On 30 December 2011, Charter 97 fell victim to a hacking attack that deleted archives and posted false news articles to the site; it also suffered a denial of service attack.

In 2020, the logo was changed to display "Charter 97%", referencing the fact that according to opposition groups, internet polling shows that support for President Lukashenko is low enough to be a statistical error, or around 3%. The phrase "97%" had become a rallying symbol of the opposition.

See also

 Belarusian democracy movement
 Charter 77 (Czechoslovakia)
 Charter 08 (China)

References

External links 
Charter 97 website
Belarus Now article about the movement

Belarusian opposition
Politics of Belarus
1997 in Belarus
1997 documents
Political charters